A crate is a large strong container, often made of wood.

Crate may also refer to:

 Crate Township, Chippewa County, Minnesota, United States
 Crate Entertainment, a US video game developer
 CrateIO, a fully searchable document oriented data store
 Cajón or crate, a percussion instrument in Peru
 Modular crate electronics
 "The Crate", a 1979 short story by Stephen King
 Ilyushin Il-14 (NATO reporting name: Crate), a Soviet aircraft
 Chuck Crate (1916–1992), Canadian fascist and leader of the Canadian Union of Fascists
 Gabe Crate (born 1977), American cartoonist, writer, and storyboard artist
 Crate engine, an automobile engine spec replacement shipped in a crate container. Crate Late Model and Crate Modified are classes named after the specification
 Crates (name), a given name and surname
 Crates (comic poet) (probably fl. late 450s or very early 440s BC), Old Comedy poet and actor from Athens
 Crates (engineer), 4th century BC engineer who accompanied Alexander the Great

See also
 Krait, a venomous snake
 Dog crate
 Gestation crate, a metal enclosure used in intensive pig farming
 Wooden box